The Crust is a British television series about a pizza parlour which was originally shown by CBBC. It was produced by Darrall Macqueen. In 2014, the show was broadcast again on the Australian children entertainment network ABC3.

Cast

Episodes

External links
 

The Crust @ Darrall Macqueen's website.

2000s British children's television series
2004 British television series debuts
2005 British television series endings
BBC children's television shows
BBC Television shows
Television shows set in London
Black British sitcoms